Cybalobotys nyasalis is a moth in the family Crambidae. It was described by Koen V. N. Maes in 2001. It is found in Malawi.

References

Moths described in 2001
Pyraustinae